The Long Beach Branch is an electrified rail line and service owned and operated by the Long Island Rail Road in the U.S. state of New York. The branch begins at Valley Interlocking, just east of Valley Stream station, where it merges with the Far Rockaway Branch to continue west as the Atlantic Branch. East from there the Long Beach Branch parallels the Montauk Branch to Lynbrook station, where it turns south toward Long Beach station.
In 2018, the branch recorded an annual ridership of 4,849,085 based on ticket sales, down 1% from 2017.

History

Origins
The Long Beach Branch began as the New York and Long Beach Railroad (NY&LB) Company, operating from Lynbrook to Long Beach in 1880. The railroad's original southern terminus was along the Atlantic Ocean. The LIRR, which had just recently been acquired by entrepreneur Austin Corbin, operated the NY&LB from its inception until 1904, when it was merged with the other lines of the LIRR. At Lynbrook, trains continued west to Hunters Point, Queens, operating on tracks built by the South Side Railroad of Long Island (which had merged with the LIRR prior to the NY&LB service).

A five-mile (8 km) extension to Point Lookout, New York owned by the Long Beach Marine Railway Company existed between 1881 and 1895. The LIRR bought the line in 1886 and continued to operate passenger service until 1895.

Pennsylvania Railroad ownership
The LIRR had planned to extend the Atlantic Branch north into Manhattan to meet the New York Central Railroad (NYCRR) at what is now Grand Central Terminal, while at the same time, NYCRR competitor Pennsylvania Railroad was planning to build a tunnel to a new Manhattan terminal from New Jersey. Following negotiations, the Pennsylvania Railroad (PRR) acquired a majority stake of the LIRR in 1900, allowing the railroads to jointly build the New York Tunnel Extension and share a Manhattan terminal at Pennsylvania Station, which opened in 1910. The line was double-tracked from Valley Stream to Lynbrook in late 1910, then from East Rockaway to Wreck Lead ("WL") on January 15, 1927. Electrification of the main tracks from Valley Stream to Long Beach was finished in September 1910, with the freight sidings being electrified between 1928 and 1930. This upgrade coincided with the PRR's electrification and grade separation of multiple suburban lines. Color light signals were installed in January 1927; they were later replaced by PRR-style position light signals.

MTA takeover
On January 20, 1965, the State of New York announced its intentions to purchase the LIRR from the PRR. The LIRR was to be operated by the newly-formed Metropolitan Commuter Transportation Authority, today's current MTA. The MTA began operating new M1 electric coaches in 1968, which resulted in the upgrading of every station on the line to high-level platforms.

The Long Beach Branch's familiar orange color scheme was first implemented on May 20, 1974 as part of the MTA's Form 8 timetable.

Hurricane Sandy and infrastructure modernization
Hurricane Sandy struck Long Island on October 29–30, 2012, and the Long Beach Branch was the most seriously affected of all the LIRR lines despite a full systemwide shutdown on October 29. Third rail power was lost, as three of the four substations on the line were knocked out. The line between Island Park and Long Beach was strewn with debris, and switch motors at Long Beach station, along with other signal and communications components on the line, were rendered inoperative due to immersion in salt water. Partial rail service was restored on November 14, when a diesel-operated shuttle between Lynbrook and Long Beach began operating on a modified weekday schedule, with shuttle buses being utilized on weekends and Thanksgiving in place of train service. Full electric service, initially not expected to return until January 2013, was restored much earlier than anticipated, on November 25, 2012.

The total cost of post-Sandy restoration projects on the branch is expected to cost $68.6 million and be completed by September 2021.

Positive train control, a federally-mandated technology to improve railroad safety, was implemented on the line on October 30, 2019.

Stations

References

External links

Long Beach Branch Stations (Unofficial LIRR History web site)
NYCSubway.org: Long Beach Branch
Original Long Beach Station & Branch (Arrt's Arrchives)
Long Beach Following Hurricane Sandy (The LIRR Today)
Long Beach Branch (The LIRR Today)

Long Island Rail Road branches
Transportation in Nassau County, New York
Railway lines opened in 1880